Amirabad (also Romanized as Amīrābād) is a village in Haft Ashiyan Rural District, Kuzaran District, Kermanshah County, Kermanshah Province, Iran. At the 2006 census, its population was 37, in nine families.

References 

Populated places in Kermanshah County